Vaiafai is a village at the east end of Savai'i island in Samoa. The village is part of the electoral constituency (Faipule District) Fa'asaleleaga 2 which is within the larger political district (Itumalo) of Fa'asaleleaga.

The population is 438.

References

Populated places in Fa'asaleleaga